Chendebji (ཅན་དན་སྦྱིས། in Dzongkha) is a village in Trongsa District in central Bhutan.

References

External links
Satellite map at Maplandia.com

Populated places in Bhutan